The 2021 Wagner Seahawks football team represented Wagner College as a member of the Northeast Conference (NEC) in the 2021 NCAA Division I FCS football season. The Seahawks, led by second-year head coach Tom Masella, played their home games at Wagner College Stadium.

Schedule

References

Wagner
Wagner Seahawks football seasons
College football winless seasons
Wagner Seahawks football